Zuzana Ondrášková (born 3 May 1980) is a former professional tennis player from the Czech Republic.

Playing career
On 9 February 2004, she reached her career-high singles ranking of world No. 74.

Her career included wins over several top players, including Dinara Safina, Li Na, Daniela Hantuchová, Marion Bartoli and Jelena Dokic.

In her career, she reached one WTA Tour singles final, 2005 at Prague. In addition, she reached the semifinals of the 2010 WRA Budapest as well as two additional quarterfinals, 2005 at Forest Hills and 2006 at Estoril. Ondrášková found most of her success on the ITF Women's Circuit, making 31 singles finals and winning 20 titles. She announced her retirement in 2013 at age 33.

WTA career finals

Singles: 1 (runner-up)

ITF finals

Singles (20–11)

Doubles (0–2)

External links

 
 

1980 births
Living people
Sportspeople from Opava
Czech female tennis players
21st-century Czech women